The 1924 Waterbury Blues season was their first season in existence and their last complete season before relocating to Hartford midway through the 1925 season. The team finished the season with a 7–2–4 record.

Schedule

References

Hartford Blues seasons